Philip Ketter (born Philip Ketterer; April 13, 1884 – April 9, 1965) was an American Major League Baseball catcher who played for the St. Louis Browns in .

External links
Baseball Reference.com

1884 births
1965 deaths
St. Louis Browns players
Baseball players from Pennsylvania
Minor league baseball managers
Hopkinsville Browns players
Bloomington Bloomers players
Columbia Gamecocks players
Marion Diggers players
York White Roses players
Johnstown Johnnies players
Chester Johnnies players
Burlington Pathfinders players
St. Joseph Drummers players
Quincy Gems players
McAlester Miners players
Taylorville Tailors players